Perishable Fruit is an album by the singer-songwriter Patty Larkin, released in 1997. It was produced by Larkin, and recorded at her home studio on Cape Cod.

Critical reception
AllMusic wrote that "the love songs were idealized at best and vague at worst, and the singer rarely seemed involved in any case."

Track listing

 "The Road"
 "The Book I'm Not Reading"
 "Coming Up for Air"
 "Angels Wings"
 "You and Me"
 "Pablo Neruda"
 "Wolf at the Door"
 "Brazil"
 "Rear View Mirror"
 "Heart"
 "Red Accordion"

All songs were written by Patty Larkin.

Album personnel
  Patty Larkin - vocals, acoustic guitar, electric guitar, mandolin, bouzouki, and various other guitars
  Jennifer Kimball - backing vocals
  Ben Wittman - lap steel percussion
  Richard Gates - fretless and fretted bass
  Marc Shulman - tiple, electric guitar, wolf electric
  Ben Wisch - backing vocals
  Jane Siberry - backing vocals
  Bette Warner - "song sculpting" and spoken word backing vocal
  Michael Manring - fretless and fretted bass, E-bow, and 10-string bass
  Gideon Freudmann - cello
  Alan Williams - Wolf-man
  Bruce Cockburn - backing vocals and acoustic guitar

References

Patty Larkin albums
1997 albums